Succulent Space Food for Teething Vampires is the second studio album by Christian horror punk band Blaster the Rocketboy, released in 1997. This was the group's final album with Boot to Head Records before going to Jackson Rubio Records under the name "Blaster the Rocket Man."

Themes
A common theme throughout the album is redemption through Jesus Christ, found in such songs as "All the Way to the Blood Bank," with the lyrics, "What can wash away my sin? Nothing but the blood of Jesus!," and in "Flesheaters,"Oh, I'm alive in Christ."

As is typical with the horror punk genre, many of the band's songs deal with "monsters," such as werewolves ("American Werewolf"), vampires ("All the Way to the Blood Bank"), and many others in "Creature Feature."

Track listing

Personnel
 Otto Rocket (Daniel Petersen) - vocals
 Chrissy Rocket - guitar
 Johhny Rocket - drums
 Mikey Rocket - bass

References
 

1997 albums
Blaster the Rocket Man albums